Saric may refer to:

Places
 Sáric Municipality, Mexico
 Sáric, a town in the municipality

People with the surname
 Šarić, a surname
 Alexander Hoehn-Saric, American attorney
 Ivan Saric (disambiguation)
 Jim Saric, American professional angler
 Lazar Saric, television writer, songwriter, producer, and director
 Mimi Saric (born 1983), Australian footballer
 Nikola Sarić (disambiguation)

See also
 Sarych, a headland on the shore of the Black Sea